Thermonema is a Gram-negative, chemoheterotrophic and aerobic genus from the phylum Bacteroidota.

References

Further reading 
 
 
 

Cytophagia
Bacteria genera